Pristiapogon exostigma, also known as Eyeshadow cardinalfish or oneline cardinalfish, is a small (max length is 11 cm) pale ray-finned fish from the family Apogonidae, the cardinalfishes with light-ended black stripe ending in black spot above centre of stripe.

 It has an Indo-Pacific range which extends from the Red Sea to the Line Islands and Mangareva Islands and south to northern Australia and north to the Ryukyu Islands.

This species spends the day sheltering under rock ledges. They can be found among isolated coral heads in the silty sheltered by reefs. It is a solitary and rather rare, nocturnal species which feeds on fishes and invertebrates. They are mouthbrooders who form pairs when courting.

References

External links
 

Apogoninae
Fish described in 1906
Taxa named by David Starr Jordan
Taxa named by Edwin Chapin Starks